The Sindbad Amusement Parks are a group of family entertainment centers and amusement parks located in the cities of Faisalabad, Islamabad, Karachi, Lahore, Multan, Rawalpindi and Sialkot in Pakistan.

In August 2015, KDA shut down the park in Gulshan-e-Iqbal area, Karachi.

See also
 List of amusement parks in Pakistan

References

Amusement parks in Pakistan
Companies based in Karachi